Panambur is one of the localities in Mangalore famous as a tourist spot and also a major industrial area. Panambur is also the site of Karnataka's only major port New Mangalore Port. Other major industries, namely Mangalore Chemicals & Fertilizers and KIOCL, are also located here. It is located in Mangalore at Dakshina Kannada (formerly South Canara) district of Karnataka state, India, north of the Gurupura River's confluence with Arabian Sea. Panambur along with Baikampady & Jokatte are the industrial regions in Mangalore & also one of the major industrial areas of Karnataka.

Etymology 

The name Panambur is derived from Panam which means "money" and Ur which means "place" or "village" in Tulu language.

Location 

It is the most popular, well connected and most visited beach of coastal Karnataka. It has many eateries, lifeguards, boat rides, etc. Beach festivals are occasionally organized here.

There is a Nandaneshwara temple in Panambur. The sea port is near to Surathkal railway station on the Mumbai-Mangalore railway route.

Many small, medium and large scale industries are located at Panambur including Mangalore Chemicals and Fertilizers and Kudremukh Iron Ore Company Limited.

New Mangalore Port Trust 
New Mangalore Port is a deep-water, all-weather port at Panambur, which is the deepest inner harbour on the west coast and the only major port of Karnataka and is currently the seventh largest port in India. It is referred as 'Gateway of Karnataka'

See also 
 Panambur Beach
 Surathkal
 Economy of Mangalore

References

External links

 Panambur Beach Information
 New Mangalore Port
 Nandaneshwara Temple



Cities and towns in Dakshina Kannada district
Localities in Mangalore